Isaac Ngandu Kasongo (born 6 December 1979 in Kinshasa) is a retired Congolese football player, who played most of his career for TP Mazembe.

International career
Ngandu was a member of the Congolese 2006 African Nations Cup team, who progressed to the quarter finals, where they were eliminated by Egypt, who eventually won the tournament. He scored a goal in the 2009 FIFA Club World Cup.

International goals

References

1979 births
Living people
Footballers from Kinshasa
Democratic Republic of the Congo footballers
Democratic Republic of the Congo international footballers
2006 Africa Cup of Nations players
Association football midfielders
SC Cilu players
TP Mazembe players
CS Don Bosco players
2011 African Nations Championship players
Democratic Republic of the Congo A' international footballers